Horikawa may refer to:

Horikawa (surname), a Japanese surname
Emperor Horikawa, emperor of Japan
Horikawa, Kyoto, one of main streets in Kyoto, whereupon lie the Horikawa Mansion of both Emperor Horikawa, and later, Minamoto no Yoshitsune
Hori River (Nagoya), known as Horikawa in Japanese